is a Japanese musician and music producer.

Nishidera is the singer and main songwriter of the band Nona Reeves, and also acts as a songwriter/composer, arranger, music producer, novelist, writer, MC for the band. He is president of Gotown Records.

Nishidera was raised in Kyoto, Kyoto Prefecture. He graduated from Kyoto Seihi High School and Waseda University Second Literature Department (Western Culture Seminar) in March 1996.

Advertisement narrations

TV appearances, specials, one-off guest programmes

Regular programmes

Radio appearances

Books

Contributions

Serials

References

External links
 

Japanese pop musicians
Japanese male composers
Japanese record producers
Shibuya-kei musicians
Waseda University alumni
Musicians from Kyoto
Musicians from Tokyo
1973 births
Living people